Duje  is a village in Gmina Barciany, within Kętrzyn County, Warmian-Masurian Voivodeship, in north-eastern Poland. The village is situated on the border with Russia. The village is situated on the road from Mołtajny to Asuny. In 1975 - 1998 the village was located in Olsztyn Voivodeship.

References

Villages in Kętrzyn County